Michel Villey (4 April 1914 – 24 July 1988) was a French legal philosopher and historian. He was a professor at the University of Strasbourg and then at the University of Paris. He was born in Caen and was the grandson of philosopher Émile Boutroux. The Institut Michel-Villey is named in his honor.

Publications

 Le droit et les droits de l'homme (PUF, Paris 1983).

References

1914 births
1988 deaths
Legal historians
Writers from Caen
Philosophers of law
Academic staff of the University of Paris
Academic staff of the University of Strasbourg